Andrew Anthony Cancio (born October 21, 1988) is an American professional boxer of Mexican descent who held the WBA (Regular) super featherweight title in 2019.

Professional career

Cancio vs. Machado 
Cancio turned pro in 2006 and had a record 19-4-2 before challenging and beating Puerto Rican boxer Alberto Machado for the WBA (Regular) super featherweight title.

Cancio vs. Machado II 
The rematch against Machado was scheduled to take place in the summer of 2019. Machado was ranked #5 by the WBA at the time. On June 21 at the Fantasy Springs Resort Casino in Indio, California. Cancio retained his WBA title via third-round stoppage of Machado, landing a strong body shot to Machado's left side and causing him to go down.

Cancio vs. Alvarado 
In his next fight, Cancio lost his belt to Rene Alvarado. Alvarado, ranked #1 by the WBA at super featherweight, dominated through most of the fight, before the referee decided to stop the fight after the end of the seventh round. Following his defeat, he was released by his promoter Golden Boy, but quickly signed a new contract with Top Rank.

Professional boxing record

See also
List of super-featherweight boxing champions

References

External links

Andrew Cancio - Profile, News Archive & Current Rankings at Box.Live

Regular title until September 1, 2019

1988 births
Living people
People from Blythe, California
Sportspeople from Riverside, California
Boxers from California
American male boxers
American boxers of Mexican descent
Featherweight boxers
Super-featherweight boxers
World super-featherweight boxing champions
World Boxing Association champions